Beth Nahrin Patriotic Union (Arabic: الاتحاد الوطني بيت نهرين) is an Assyrian political party founded in 1996, in the Slemani area of Iraq, as part of the Dawronoye movement. Since the 2003 Iraq War, the party has taken part in the country's elections, but has failed to ever win a seat. It is the Iraqi branch of Bethnahrin National Council.

References

1996 establishments in Iraq
Assyrian political parties
Dawronoye
Political parties established in 1996
Political parties in Iraq